Haji Nooruddin Azizi (حاجي نورالدین عزیزي) is an Afghan politician and the current acting Minister of Commerce and Industry since 21 September 2021.

References

Year of birth missing (living people)
Living people
Taliban government ministers of Afghanistan
Place of birth missing (living people)
Afghan Tajik people
People from Panjshir Province